The following list sorts all cities in the Spanish autonomous community of Andalusia with a population of more than 25,000. As of January 1, 2018, 56 cities fulfill this criterion and are listed here. This list refers only to the population of individual municipalities within their defined limits, which does not include other municipalities or suburban areas within urban agglomerations.

List 
The following table lists the 56 cities in Andalusia with a population of at least 25,000 on January 1, 2018, as estimated by the Instituto Nacional de Estadística. A city is displayed in bold if it is a state or federal capital.

References 

Andalusia